Sandved is a village, with a population of 704 (1st January 2022), in Næstved Municipality, Region Zealand, Denmark.

References

Næstved Municipality